Lyudmil Kirkov (14 December 1933 – 12 December 1995) was a Bulgarian film director and actor.

Kirkov was among the prominent Bulgarian film and theatre directors from the last decades of the 20th century. He directed some of the most popular Bulgarian films of that time, most notably The Swedish Kings (1968), The Boy Turns Man (1972), A Peasant on a Bicycle (1974), Matriarchy (1977) and the hit film A Nameless Band (1982). He received the Silver Prize for the film Balance (1983) at the 13th Moscow International Film Festival. In the 1975, Kirkov was nominated for the Golden Prize at the 9th Moscow International Film Festival for the film A Peasant on a Bicycle.

Filmography

Director

References

Sources

External links
 

Bulgarian film directors
1933 births
1995 deaths
People from Vratsa